Cathy Kipp is an American politician, currently serving as a member of the Colorado House of Representatives from the 52nd district, which includes Fort Collins, Colorado.

Early life and education 
Kipp was born and raised in Berkeley, California. She earned a Bachelor of Science degree in Computer and Information Science from the University of California, Santa Cruz. After graduating from college, she moved to Fort Collins, Colorado.

Career 
Prior to entering politics, Kipp worked as a database engineer. She served as a member of the Poudre School District Board of Education from 2011 to 2017. She was appointed to serve in the Colorado House of Representatives in 2019, replacing Democratic incumbent Joann Ginal, who was appointed to fill a vacant seat in the Colorado Senate.

Personal life 
Kipp and her husband, Don, have twin boys.

References 

Democratic Party members of the Colorado House of Representatives
University of California, Santa Cruz alumni
Year of birth missing (living people)
Living people
21st-century American politicians
21st-century American women politicians
Women state legislators in Colorado